Family Readiness Group (FRG) is a command-sponsored organization of family members, volunteers, soldiers, and civilian employees associated with a particular unit within the United States Army, the United States Army Reserve, and the Army National Guard communities. They are normally organized at company and battalion levels, and fall under the responsibility of the unit's commanding officer.

FRG's are established to provide activities and support to enhance the flow of information, increase the resiliency of unit soldiers and their families, provide practical tools for adjusting to military deployments and separations, and enhance the well-being and esprit de corps within the unit. Since one of the goals of an FRG is to support the military mission through provision of support, outreach, and information to family members, certain FRG activities are essential and common to all groups, and include member meetings, staff and committee meetings, publication and distribution of newsletters, maintenance of virtual FRG websites, maintenance of updated rosters and readiness information, and member telephone trees and e-mail distribution lists.  

All army units, both active and reserve, sponsor FRGs as an avenue of mutual support and assistance, and as a network of communications among the family members, the chain of command, chain of concern, and community resources. The FRG also provides feedback to the command on the state of the unit "family" and is considered a unit commander’s program.

FRGs developed out of military family support groups as well as less formal officer and enlisted wives clubs, telephone and social rosters, volunteer groups, and clubs.  Modern FRGs are a fully defined and officially supported function within the U.S. Army, and include men, women, and children from throughout the military community.

Mission 
Foster competent, knowledgeable, and resilient families.
Act as an extension of the unit in providing official, accurate command information.
Provide mutual support.
Build Soldier and family cohesion and foster a positive outlook.
Advocate more efficient use of community resources.
Help families solve problems at the lowest level.
Reduce stress and promote Soldier and family readiness.
Contribute to the well-being and esprit de corps of the unit.

Goals 
Gaining necessary family support during deployments.
Preparing for deployments and redeployments.
Helping families adjust to military life and cope with deployments.
Developing open and honest channels of communication between the command and family members.
Promoting confidence, cohesion, commitment, and a sense of well-being among the unit’s Soldiers.

Activities 
Some activities that FRGs commonly sponsor coordinate, or participate in that directly or indirectly foster unit family readiness goals include (but are not limited to):
Classes and workshops.
Volunteer recognition.
Unit send-off and welcome home activities.
FRG member, staff or committee meetings.
Newcomer orientation and sponsorship.

Of note with regard to classes and workshops, Army Community Service has programs and services that can provide support and subject matter experts to educate family members on a variety of subjects: i.e. military benefits, prenatal care, preparing for deployments, family services, Operation READY training, Army Family Team Building, coping with stress, reunion, homecoming, reintegration, deployment cycle support, etc.  Of note with regard to unit send-offs and homecoming activities, these events are garrison funded, and should not be funded with monies designated for FRGs, which are primarily raised by non-profit fundraising efforts.

See also
Morale, Welfare and Recreation
United States Marine Corps Wounded Warrior Regiment

Notes

External links 
 The United States Army FRG Home Page
 ANG Family Readiness Program
 DoD Deployment Link
 Hooah 4 Health includes the FRG Handbook

United States military support organizations
Military life